Fuego (born December 11, 1981) is a Mexican luchador enmascarado, or masked professional wrestler currently working for the Mexican professional wrestling promotion Consejo Mundial de Lucha Libre (CMLL). His original ring character, Flash, was inspired by the comic book character The Flash. Fuego regularly teams with Stuka, Jr., with whom he held the CMLL Arena Coliseo Tag Team Championship for a record four and a half years. Fuego's real name is not a matter of public record, as is often the case with masked wrestlers in Mexico where their private lives are kept a secret from the wrestling fans. On November 19, 2009 it was announced that Flash was changing his ring name to Fuego (Spanish for "Fire") from that point forward.

Professional wrestling career
Flash made his professional wrestling debut in 2003, immediately adopting the ring name Flash and an outfit and mask that was patterned after the comic book character The Flash, although he would often change the main color of his outfit to blue or white and not just the red of the original character. After only a year of professional experience Flash was offered and accepted a contract with the Mexican promotion Consejo Mundial de Lucha Libre (CMLL). Flash made his CMLL debut in April, 2004 on a show in Puebla, Puebla working mainly in the first and second match of the night. Flash's first top level exposure came in 2007 when he teamed with Marco Corleone in the 2007 Gran Alternativa tournament. The team lost to Dos Caras, Jr. and Valiente in the first round.

Teaming with Stuka, Jr.
By 2008 Flash had begun teaming with Stuka, Jr. on a semi-regular basis, especially on CMLL's "lower level" shows away from Arena Mexico. When CMLL announced that they were bringing back the CMLL Arena Coliseo Tag Team Championship in June, 2008 the team of Flash and Stuka, Jr. was one of the 16 teams entered in the tournament. The first three rounds of the tournament took place on June 22, 2008 and saw Stucka, Jr. and Flash defeated Astro Boy and Molotov in the first round, the Los Guerreros Tuareg team of Nitro and Skandalo in the quarter final and Bronco and Diamante Negro in the semi final The team faced and defeated Los Infernales (Nosferatu and Euforia) in the final on June 28, 2008 to win the Arena Colise Tag Team Championship. Flash and Stuka, Jr. teamed with Máscara Purpura to defeat the Guerreros Tuareg team of Arkangel de la Muerte, Loco Max and Skándalo at CMLL's 2008 Infierno en el Ring event. Through the fall of 2009 Flash and Stuka, Jr. worked a series of matches against Los Infernales, including a successful tag team title defense on December 14, 2008. Los Infernales defeated Stuka, Jr. and Flash at CMLL's La Hora Cero PPV on January 11, 2009 but the Coliseo Tag Team title was not on the line. Flash and Stuka, Jr. teamed with Metalico at CMLL's 2009 Infierno en el Ring event as the trio lost to the team of Virus, Euforia and Skandalo. At a CMLL press conference on November 19, 2009 it was announced that Flash had changed his name to "Fuego" ("Fire") and along with the name changed his outfit to a "fire" inspired outfit instead of the outfit that closely resembled the DC superhero. On March 3, 2013, Fuego's and Stuka, Jr.'s four and a half year reign as the CMLL Arena Coliseo Tag Team Champions came to an end, when they lost the title to La Fievre Amarilla ("The Yellow Fever"; Namajague and Okumura). On October 27, Fuego won his first singles title, when he defeated Bárbaro Cavernario for the Occidente Middleweight Championship. From January 14 to 19, 2014, Fuego worked the New Japan Pro-Wrestling (NJPW) and CMLL co-produced Fantastica Mania 2014 tour, which marked his debut in Japan. For the entire tour, Fuego worked undercard matches, often teaming with Rey Cometa and Stuka, Jr. From June 28 to July 13, 2014, Fuego worked another tour with NJPW, working opposite Máscara Dorada. On October 25, 2014, Fuego returned to NJPW, teaming up with Ryusuke Taguchi for the 2014 Super Junior Tag Tournament. The team lost to El Desperado and Taichi in the first round. Fuego remained with NJPW until November 8.

On December 25, 2015 as part of CMLL's annual Infierno en el Ring show Fuego was one of twelve men risking their mask in the main event steel cage match. He was the ninth man to leave the cage, keeping his mask safe in the process. Three days later Fuego once again risked his mask in a steel cage match, this time in Arena Puebla where ten men risked their masks or hair in the ring. Once again Fuego escaped the ring, keeping his mask safe.

On October 21, 2016, Fuego took part in 2016 Super Jr. Tag Tournament which was held at Road to Power Struggle event, teaming up with Ryusuke Taguchi. They advanced to the next round after defeating the team of Jushin Thunder Liger and Tiger Mask in the first round. In the semi-finals Fuego and Taguchi lost to Roppongi Vice (Beretta and Rocky Romero) to be eliminated from the tournament.

Not to be mistaken for
Several wrestlers have used the ring name "Flash", most notably a wrestler from Guadalajara, Jalisco, Mexico who held the Mexican National Lightweight Championship under that name. The Guadalajara Flash passed the name on to his sons who wrestle as Flash I and Flash II or alternately Hijo de Flash I and Hijo de Flash II.

Championships and accomplishments
Consejo Mundial de Lucha Libre
CMLL Arena Coliseo Tag Team Championship (1 time) – with Stuka, Jr.
Occidente Middleweight Championship (1 time)

Luchas de Apuestas record

Notes

References

1981 births
Living people
Masked wrestlers
Mexican male professional wrestlers
Professional wrestlers from Oaxaca
People from Oaxaca City
Unidentified wrestlers